Henry Givens Baker Jr. is an American computer scientist who has made contributions in garbage collection, functional programming languages, and linear logic. He was one of the founders of Symbolics, a company that designed and manufactured a line of Lisp machines. In 2006 he was recognized as a Distinguished Scientist by the Association for Computing Machinery.

He is notable for his research in garbage collection, particularly Baker's real-time copying collector, and on the Actor model.

Baker received his B.Sc. (1969), S.M. (1973), E.E. (1973), and Ph.D. (1978) degrees at M.I.T.

The Chicken Scheme compiler was inspired by an innovative design of Baker's.

Bibliography

References

External links
 Henry Baker's Archive of Research Papers at the Internet Archive

Programming language researchers
Living people
Year of birth missing (living people)
Massachusetts Institute of Technology alumni
American computer scientists